Stiphrometasia is a genus of moths of the family Crambidae.

Species
Stiphrometasia monialis (Erschoff, 1872)
Stiphrometasia pavonialis (Walsingham & Hampson, 1896)
Stiphrometasia petryi Amsel, 1935
Stiphrometasia pharaonalis Caradja, 1916
Stiphrometasia sancta (Hampson, 1900)

References

Natural History Museum Lepidoptera genus database

Cybalomiinae
Crambidae genera